Southwark Coroner's Court is the Coroner's Court for inner south London. It is located at Tennis Street, London. The court covers cases for the London boroughs of Greenwich, Lambeth, Lewisham and Southwark.

References 

London Borough of Southwark
Coroner's courts in London